Siyavosh Beg, also known by his nisba of Bāshīāchūghī (died  or 1655), was a Safavid military commander, official, and gholam of Georgian origin.

Siyavosh Beg rose through the ranks to become a military officer (yuzbashi) early on in his career. In 1632, he was appointed as the new governor (hakem) of Derbent and as commander of the élite gholam corps (qollar-aghasi), succeeding Khosrow Mirza (later Rostam Khan of Kartli) to this post. He remained commander of the corps for a lengthy period.

From 1645 to 1649, he served as the governor (hakem and beglarbeg) of Kuhgiluyeh. When in 1645 the re-appointed grand vizier Khalifeh Sultan urged for repressive laws against Isfahan's large Armenian community, the latter turned to Siyavosh Beg, himself a former Christian.

Like his then incumbent king Abbas II (1642-1666), Siyavosh Beg was an avid drinker. Siyavosh Beg's nisba is derived from "Bash-Achuk", a Persian appellation of the Kingdom of Imereti, in western Georgia, where he hailed from.

Notes

Sources
 
 
  
 
 
 

1650s deaths
Iranian people of Georgian descent
Safavid governors of Derbent
Safavid governors of Kuhgiluyeh
Safavid generals
Converts to Shia Islam from Eastern Orthodoxy
Shia Muslims from Georgia (country)
Qollar-aghasi
Former Georgian Orthodox Christians
17th-century people of Safavid Iran
Safavid ghilman